Gunnar Jervill (born 23 November 1945) is an archer from Sweden, who was born in Gothenburg.

He competed for Sweden in the 1972 Summer Olympics held in Munich, Germany in the individual event where he finished in second place behind American John Williams.  Four years later he finished 14th at the 1976 Summer Olympics held in Montreal, Quebec, Canada

References
Sports-reference

1945 births
Living people
Sportspeople from Gothenburg
Swedish male archers
Olympic archers of Sweden
Olympic silver medalists for Sweden
Archers at the 1972 Summer Olympics
Archers at the 1976 Summer Olympics
Olympic medalists in archery
Medalists at the 1972 Summer Olympics
20th-century Swedish people
21st-century Swedish people